Janata (janatā), is a Hindi word for "the populace"; or "the people". Following the first Janata coalition in the 1970s between the Lok Dal, the Congress (O) and the Socialist Party, it has become part of the name of a number of federal- and state-level, present and historical, political parties in India or neighbouring states (many of which claim descent from constituents of the original coalition), including:

In Indian federal politics:
Janata Party
Janata Parivar
Bharatiya Janata Party
Bharatiya Janata Yuva Morcha
Hindustan Janata Party
Janata Dal 
Janata Dal (Secular)
Janata Dal (United)
Janata Party (Secular)
Loktantrik Janata Dal
Rashtriya Janata Dal
Socialist Janata (Democratic)
Samajwadi Janata Dal
Samajwadi Janata Dal (Democratic)
Samajwadi Janata Party
Samajwadi Janata Party (Rashtriya)

In Indian constitutive states:
Asom Bharatiya Janata Party (Assam)
Biju Janata Dal (Orissa)
Chhattisgarh Janata Congress
Gujarat Janata Congress
Janata Dal (Gujarat)
Karnataka Janata Paksha
 Kerala Janatha
Mizo Janata Dal (Mizoram)
Rashtravadi Janata Party
Rashtriya Janata Party
Sikkim Janata Congress
Sikkim Janata Party
Tamizhaga Janata Party (Tamil)
Telangana Janata Party (Andhra Pradesh)
Vidarbha Janata Congress (Maharashtra)

Outside India:
Krishak Shramik Janata League (Bangladesh)
Janata Dal (Samajbadi Prajatantrik) (Nepal)
Rastriya Janata Party Nepal
Nepal Samajwadi Janata Dal 
Janata Bank, state-owned bank in Bangladesh

See also
Jana (disambiguation), people in Hindi
Lok (disambiguation), people in Hindi
Awam (disambiguation), people in Urdu
Awami (disambiguation)

Political terminology in India
Hindi words and phrases